The Chamí antpitta (Grallaria alvarezi) is a species of bird in the family Grallariidae. It is endemic to Colombia. It is a member of the rufous antpitta species complex and was first described by Andrés M. Cuervo, Carlos Daniel Cadena, Morton L. Isler and R. Terry Chesser in 2020.

Taxonomy 
The Chamí antpitta was found to be a unique species in the rufous antpitta complex differentiated by plumage color, vocalizations and genetic differences.

The common name Chamí is named for the Embera Chamí indigenous community who inhabit the western slopes of Colombian Andes. Nymphargus chami, an endemic Colombian frog, is also named for the Chamí. The specific name alvarezi is named in honor of the Colombian ornithologist Mauricio Álvarez Rebolledo.

Distribution and habitat 
The Chamí antpitta is endemic to the western Colombian Andes from Antioquia in the north to Cauca in the south and west of the Cauca river. They are found at elevations of 2,350-3,650 m. They inhabit humid montane forests and forest edges.

The Cauca river separates the Chamí antpitta from the closely related Equatorial antpitta.

References 

Grallaria
Endemic fauna of Colombia
Birds of Colombia